In Secret (also known as Thérèse) is a 2013 American erotic thriller romance film written and directed by Charlie Stratton. Based on Émile Zola's classic 1867 novel Thérèse Raquin and the 2009 stage play by the same name penned by Neal Bell, the film stars Elizabeth Olsen, Tom Felton, Oscar Isaac and Jessica Lange. It was screened in the Special Presentation section at the 2013 Toronto International Film Festival. The film received a regional release on February 21, 2014.

Plot
In the lower echelons of Parisian society in the 1860s, Thérèse Raquin is a beautiful, sexually repressed young woman trapped in a loveless marriage to her sickly cousin, Camille, who she was forced to marry by her domineering aunt, Madame Raquin.

Thérèse spends her days confined behind the counter of a small shop and her evenings watching Madame Raquin play dominoes with an eclectic group of acquaintances. After she meets her husband's alluring friend Laurent LeClaire, the two embark on an illicit affair that leads to tragic consequences.

During an outing on the lake with Laurent and Therese, Camille is beaten to death by Laurent and subsequently drowns. Madame Raquin finds it difficult to come to terms with her son's death and is soon incapacitated by a stroke, but overhears Laurent and Therese speaking about what they did. With great effort, she alerts one of their friends, who informs the authorities.

To escape being sentenced for the murder, Laurent and Therese choose to take their own lives. They go down to the river and share one final kiss after drinking poison mixed with champagne, and thus they die in front of Madame Raquin.

Cast
 Elizabeth Olsen as Thérèse Raquin
 Lily Laight as young Thérèse
 Tom Felton as Camille Raquin, Thérèse's husband and first cousin.
 Dimitrije Bogdanov as young Camille
 Oscar Isaac as Laurent LeClaire, a childhood friend and co-worker of Camille who seduces his wife, Thérèse.
 Jessica Lange as Madame Raquin, Camille's mother and Thérèse's aunt.
 Matt Lucas as Olivier
 Shirley Henderson as Suzanne
 Mackenzie Crook as Grivet
 John Kavanagh as Inspector Michaud

Production

Filming
On May 9, 2012, principal photography began in Belgrade, Serbia and Budapest, Hungary.

Reception
In Secret received mixed reviews. On review aggregation website Rotten Tomatoes, the film holds a 41% approval rating, with an average score of 5.34/10, based on reviews from 88 critics. The consensus states: "Although it benefits from a strong cast, In Secrets stars can't totally compensate for the movie's sodden pacing and overly familiar story." 

Despite mixed reviews, Lange's performance has received critical acclaim. Avi Offer from NYC Movie Guru proclaimed Lange as "...one of the greatest actresses of our time, [who] delivers a mesmerizing, magnificent performance and sinks her teeth into her role quite smoothly." David Lee Dallas from Slant Magazine called Lange's character's "latent severity dangerous and surprising." Michael O'Sullivan from The Washington Post noted that "Subtlety may not be this film's strong suit, but it certainly is Lange's." Dustin Putman of the Washington D.C. Area Film Critics Association felt Lange is "more achingly vulnerable than the figures she usually plays." Jessica Herdon of Associated Press added that Lange "...going from agonized to helpless, so poignantly that your heart breaks for her." Joshua Rothkopf from Time Out New York wrote: "...Jessica Lange, as rare as a unicorn these days, seizes on the role of a grieving mother with two taloned hands. If there are any tremors of shame to be felt here, they emanate from her." Odie Henderson praises Lange on her ability to "...[find] the perfect line of lunacy to toe, which In Secret requires for her character's arc..." Also, Emma Myers from Film Comment described her ability to "[maintain] a looming presence that shifts from despicable to sympathetic and back again." USA Today described her work as her "...most fully dimensional performance." Variety mentioned that Lange "...relishes what becomes the most dramatically potent role."

References

External links
 
 
 
 
 

2013 films
2013 crime drama films
2010s erotic drama films
2010s erotic thriller films
2013 thriller drama films
American crime drama films
American erotic drama films
American erotic romance films
American erotic thriller films
American thriller drama films
2010s English-language films
Films about murder
Films about sexuality
Films based on works by Émile Zola
Films set in Paris
Films based on adaptations
Films set in the 1860s
Films shot in Belgrade
Films shot in Budapest
American independent films
Films scored by Gabriel Yared
Roadside Attractions films
2013 directorial debut films
2010s American films
2013 independent films